Eremias suphani (commonly known as the Suphan racerunner or Başoğlu's racerunner) is a species of lizard found in the vicinity of Lake Van, Turkey.

References

Eremias
Endemic fauna of Turkey
Reptiles described in 1968
Taxa named by Muhtar Başoğlu
Taxa named by Walter Hellmich